Yŏmju station is a railway station in Yŏmju-ŭp, Yŏmju County, North P'yŏngan Province, North Korea. It is the junction point of the P'yŏngŭi and Paengma lines of the Korean State Railway.

History
The station was opened, along with the rest of this section of the Kyŏngŭi Line, on 5 November 1905.

After the bridge across the Yalu River was opened on 1 November 1911, connecting Sinŭiju to Dandong, China, Yŏmju station became a stop for international trains to and from Manchuria. It is still a stopping point for international trains between P'yŏngyang and Beijing.

When the Kyŏngŭi line was opened, the mainline followed the route of the current Paengma Line; after the nationalisation of the railways in 1945, the Yŏmju–Ryongch'ŏn–Namsinŭiju line was reclassified as the mainline of the P'yŏngŭi line, while the line via Paengma was designated a secondary line.

References

Railway stations in North Korea
Buildings and structures in North Pyongan Province
Railway stations in Korea opened in 1905